Pang Qianyu is a Chinese freestyle wrestler. She won the silver medal in the 53 kg event at the 2020 Summer Olympics held in Tokyo, Japan. She won a bronze medal in the women's 53 kg event at the 2018 World Wrestling Championships and again in 2019 in the women's 53 kg event at the 2019 World Wrestling Championships.

Career 

At the 2016 Asian Wrestling Championships held in Bangkok, Thailand, she won the gold medal in the women's 53 kg event.

She competed in the women's 53 kg event at the 2018 Asian Games held in Jakarta, Indonesia without winning a medal. She was eliminated in her first match by Haruna Okuno of Japan.

Major results

References

External links 
 

Living people
Place of birth missing (living people)
Chinese female sport wrestlers
World Wrestling Championships medalists
Wrestlers at the 2018 Asian Games
Asian Games competitors for China
Wrestlers at the 2020 Summer Olympics
Olympic wrestlers of China
Medalists at the 2020 Summer Olympics
Olympic medalists in wrestling
Olympic silver medalists for China
1996 births
21st-century Chinese women